Einstein (October 23, 2002 - October 28, 2020) was a Thoroughbred racehorse who competed in the United States.

Background
Einstein was a dark bay or brown horse bred in Brazil by Fazenda Mondesir. He was sired by the 1985 American Horse of the Year, Spend A Buck. His dam, Gay Charm, was the 1988 Brazilian Champion Three-Year-Old Filly. His damsire was Ghadeer, a son of Lyphard and an influential stallion in Brazil who sired twenty-five Group One winners.

When he was brought to the United States, Einstein's new owners entrusted his race conditioning to Helen Pitts, who had taken over their stable upon the retirement of Kenneth McPeek.

Racing career
Einstein made his American debut on February 25, 2006 at Gulfstream Park in Florida, where he won the first of his two Gulfstream Park Turf Handicaps. He went on to wins that include races on three different track surfaces: the Turf Classic Stakes on turf and the Clark Handicap on dirt, both in 2008 at Churchill Downs, and in 2009, California's richest race, the Santa Anita Handicap on Pro-Ride synthetic dirt.

Einstein successfully defended his title in the Grade I Woodford Reserve-sponsored Turf Classic Stakes on May 2, 2009. 
on June 13 he was going for a world record, trying to be the first horse to win Grade 1 races on all three surfaces in the same year, first in the Santa Anita, then in the Woodford, and lastly on dirt in the race he got second in before, the Stephen Foster Handicap. In the Stephen Foster, he struggled to obtain a clear run and was repeatedly blocked before finishing third to Macho Again.

Next, he ran in the Arlington Million, a race he placed badly in 2008. He went up against the world's top turf horses, including American stars Gio Ponti and Presious Passion and International turf horses Gloria De Campeao (the French horse who placed second in the 2009 Dubai World Cup), Cima de Triomphe, and Stotsfold. Other American entries were Mr. Sidney, Just As Well, and Recapturetheglory, who placed fifth in the 2008 Kentucky Derby. 
Einstein ran a bad race, and never showed the late kick he usually had, coming in sixth to rising star Gio Ponti.

On September 3, 2009, it was announced that Frank Stronach purchased the horse from Midnight Cry Stables.

Einstein ran in the Pacific Classic Stakes at Del Mar Racetrack in California but was beaten by a neck by longshot Richard's Kid. His next race was the Breeders' Cup Classic on November 7. He had already won on the same track at the same distance over the same surface, but due to the entries of Rip Van Winkle and the top mare in the country Zenyatta, he was not a favorite.  "It's the biggest race of his life, I want him to come in fresh," trainer Helen Pitts said . Einstein proved to be one of the major disappointments in the race, finishing 11th out of 12 runners.

On November 27 at Churchill Downs Einstein ran in the Grade II Clark Handicap and, carrying the high weight of the race, finished a game third after starting from the outside gate (14th Post Position) and being blocked in the stretch.

In 2006, Einstein was rated 117 (tied for 72nd) in the World Thoroughbred Racehorse Rankings. In 2007, Einstein was rated 117 (tied for 79th) in the World Thoroughbred Racehorse Rankings. In 2008, Einstein was rated 118 (tied for 80th) in the World Thoroughbred Rankings. In 2009, Einstein was rated 120 (tied for 43rd) in the World Thoroughbred Rankings.

Racing statistics 

An asterisk after the odds means Einstein was the post time favorite.

Stud career
Einstein was retired to stand stud at Stronach's Adena Springs farm near Paris, Kentucky for a stud fee of $7,500 in 2010. In 2015, he was moved to Adena Springs' Canada location. He stood at Magali Farms in 2016 and Daeling Ranch in 2017 and 2018. His progeny include graded stakes placed horses Rankhasprivileges, Scholar Athlete, Seeking Albert, and Iranistan.

He was pensioned to Old Friends Thoroughbred Retirement Farm in Georgetown, Kentucky on March 11, 2019. He was euthanized at the age of 18 on October 28, 2020, after suffering complications from cancer.

Pedigree

References

2002 racehorse births
2020 racehorse deaths
Racehorses bred in Brazil
Racehorses trained in the United States
American Grade 1 Stakes winners
Thoroughbred family 3-c